Jeremy Moors is an Australian former professional rugby league footballer who played in the 1990s. He played for Canterbury-Bankstown and Balmain in NSWRL/ARL competition.

Playing career
Moors made his first grade debut for Canterbury-Bankstown in round 22 of the 1992 NSWRL season against arch-rivals Parramatta at Parramatta Stadium. Moors played on the wing in Canterbury's 16-16 draw. In 1995, Moors joined Balmain at a time when the club were known as the "Sydney Tigers". Moors made nine appearances for the club throughout the 1995 ARL season before being released.

References

1971 births
Canterbury-Bankstown Bulldogs players
Balmain Tigers players
Australian rugby league players
Rugby league wingers
Living people